Bariki-ye Mohammad Qoli (also Romanized as Bārīḵī-ye Moḩammad Qolī) is a village in Shahi Rural District, Sardasht District, Dezful County, Khuzestan Province, Iran. At the 2006 census, its population was 61, in 14 families.

References 

Populated places in Dezful County